Water willow may mean:
 Decodon verticillatus, a species of flowering plant
 Justicia, a genus of flowering plants
 Water Willow (Rossetti), an 1871 painting by Dante Gabriel Rossetti

See also
False waterwillow